Robert Kells,  (7 April 1832 – 14 April 1905) was a recipient of the Victoria Cross.

Details
Kells was born in India on 7 April 1832 in Meerut. When 25 years old, and a lance-corporal in the 9th Lancers (The Queen's Royal), British Army during the Indian Mutiny when the following deed took place on 28 September 1857 at Bolandshahr, India for which he was awarded the VC:

Further information
He later joined the 1st Bengal European Light Cavalry (renamed the 19th Hussars in 1862) and achieved the rank of sergeant. He retired in 1868 and was appointed a Yeoman of the Queen's (Queen Victoria) Bodyguard on 1 January 1881. In June 1901 he received the Royal Victorian Medal from King Edward VII during an inspection of the Yeomen.

Kells died on 14 April 1905 and he is buried in Lambeth cemetery in South London.

His Victoria Cross medal is one of four of his on display at the regimental museum of the 9th/12th Lancers in Derby Museum and Art Gallery. These medals sold at auction in 2006 for 130,000 pounds.

References

1832 births
1905 deaths
19th Royal Hussars soldiers
9th Queen's Royal Lancers soldiers
British Army recipients of the Victoria Cross
British East India Company Army soldiers
British military personnel of the Second Anglo-Sikh War
British recipients of the Victoria Cross
Indian Rebellion of 1857 recipients of the Victoria Cross
People from Meerut
Recipients of the Royal Victorian Medal